Piero Alejandro Gárate Rojas (born 24 May 1992) is a Chilean professional footballer who last played for San Marcos as a defensive midfielder.

Club career
A product of Santiago Wanderers youth system, he played for the team in both Primera B and Chilean Primera División. Then, he played for Deportes Concepción and Trasandino.

From 2017 to 2019 he played abroad for both Miramar Misiones in Uruguay and Presidente Hayes in Paraguay.

In the 2020 season, he played for Deportes Puerto Montt, with whom Gárate has had legal issues since the club did not take responsibility for a serious injury that he suffered while he was a player of it. 

In 2021, he played for San Marcos de Arica.

International career
Then he took part of the Chile U17 squad between 2008 and 2009.

References

External links
 
 
 Piero Gárate at PlaymakerStats
 Piero Gárate at MemoriaWanderers 

1992 births
Living people
Sportspeople from Valparaíso
Chilean footballers
Chilean expatriate footballers
Chile youth international footballers
Santiago Wanderers footballers
Deportes Concepción (Chile) footballers
Trasandino footballers
Miramar Misiones players
Club Presidente Hayes footballers
Puerto Montt footballers
San Marcos de Arica footballers
Chilean Primera División players
Primera B de Chile players
Segunda División Profesional de Chile players
Uruguayan Segunda División players
Chilean expatriate sportspeople in Uruguay
Chilean expatriate sportspeople in Paraguay
Expatriate footballers in Uruguay
Expatriate footballers in Paraguay
Association football midfielders
Chilean men's futsal players